Nur al-Din Kahala (also known as Nureddin Kahalle;  1908–1965) was a Syrian politician during the United Arab Republic (UAR) period (1958–1961). Prior to the UAR period, he served as a minor government bureaucrat.

Biography
Kahala graduated from Robert College in Istanbul, Turkey. Then he received engineering training in the United States. He represented Syria in the first meeting of the United Nations held in San Francisco, USA, in March 1945.

Kahala was initially appointed as the President of the Northern Region (Syria) Executive Council, but on 19 July 1960, President Gamal Abdel Nasser appointed him as vice president in place of Akram al-Hawrani. He served alongside vice presidents Abdel Hakim Amer and Abdel Latif Boghdadi. On 20 September 1960 he was appointed the additional post of planning minister.

Bibliography

References

External links

1908 births
1965 deaths
Vice-presidents of Egypt
Vice presidents of Syria
Syrian ministers of state planning
Prime Ministers of Syria
Syrian people of Turkish descent
Syrian engineers
20th-century engineers
People from Homs
Robert College alumni